A playwright or dramatist is a person who writes plays.

Etymology

The word "play" is from Middle English pleye, from Old English plæġ, pleġa, plæġa ("play, exercise; sport, game; drama, applause"). The word "wright" is an archaic English term for a craftsman or builder (as in a wheelwright or cartwright). The words combine to indicate a person who has "wrought" words, themes, and other elements into a dramatic form—a play. (The homophone with "write" is coincidental.)

The first recorded use of the term "playwright" is from 1605, 73 years before the first written record of the term "dramatist". It appears to have been first used in a pejorative sense by Ben Jonson to suggest a mere tradesman fashioning works for the theatre.

Jonson uses the word in his Epigram 49, which is thought to refer to John Marston:

Epigram XLIX — On Playwright
PLAYWRIGHT me reads, and still my verses damns,
He says I want the tongue of epigrams ;
I have no salt, no bawdry he doth mean ;
For witty, in his language, is obscene.
Playwright, I loath to have thy manners known
In my chaste book ; I profess them in thine own.

Jonson described himself as a poet, not a playwright, since plays during that time were written in meter and so were regarded as the province of poets. This view was held as late as the early 19th century. The term "playwright" later again lost this negative connotation.

History

Early playwrights
The earliest playwrights in Western literature with surviving works are the Ancient Greeks. These early plays were for annual Athenian competitions among play writers held around the 5th century BC. Such notables as Aeschylus, Sophocles, Euripides, and Aristophanes established forms still relied on by their modern counterparts. For the ancient Greeks, playwriting involved poïesis, "the act of making". This is the source of the English word poet.

Aristotle's Poetics techniques

In the 4th century BCE, Aristotle wrote his Poetics, in which he analyzed the principle of action or praxis as the basis for tragedy. He then considered elements of drama: plot (μύθος mythos), character (ἔθος ethos), thought (dianoia), diction (lexis), music (melodia), and spectacle (opsis). Since the myths, on which Greek tragedy were based, were widely known, plot had to do with the arrangement and selection of existing material. Character was determined by choice and by action. Tragedy is mimesis—"the imitation of an action that is serious". He developed his notion of hamartia, or tragic flaw, an error in judgment by the main character or protagonist, which provides the basis for the "conflict-driven" play.

Neo-classical theory

The Italian Renaissance brought about a stricter interpretation of Aristotle, as this long-lost work came to light in the late 15th century. The neoclassical ideal, which was to reach its apogee in France during the 17th century, dwelled upon the unities, of action, place, and time. This meant that the playwright had to construct the play so that its "virtual" time would not exceed 24 hours, that it would be restricted to a single setting, and that there would be no subplots. Other terms, such as verisimilitude and decorum, circumscribed the subject matter significantly. For example, verisimilitude limits of the unities. Decorum fitted proper protocols for behavior and language on stage. 
In France, contained too many events and actions, thus, violating the 24-hour restriction of the unity of time. Neoclassicism never had as much traction in England, and Shakespeare's plays are directly opposed to these models, while in Italy, improvised and bawdy commedia dell'arte and opera were more popular forms. In England, after the Interregnum, and restoration of the monarchy in 1660, there was a move toward neoclassical dramaturgy.

One structural unit that is still useful to playwrights today is the "French scene", which is a scene in a play where the beginning and end are marked by a change in the makeup of the group of characters onstage rather than by the lights going up or down or the set being changed.

Well-made play

Popularized in the nineteenth century by the French playwrights Eugène Scribe and Victorien Sardou, and perhaps the most schematic of all formats, the "well-made play" relies on a series of coincidences (for better or worse) that determined the action. This plot driven format is often reliant on a prop device, such as a glass of water, or letter that reveals some secret information. In most cases, the character receiving the secret information misinterprets its contents, thus setting off a chain of events. Well-made plays are thus motivated by various plot devices which lead to "discoveries" and "reversals of action," rather than being character motivated. Henrik Ibsen's A Doll's House is an example of a well-made structure (built around the discovery of Krogstad's letter) that began to integrate a more realistic approach to character. The character Nora's leaving is as much motivated by "the letter" and disclosure of a "past secret" as it is by her own determination to strike out on her own. The well-made play infiltrated other forms of writing and is still seen in popular formats such as the mystery, or "whodunit."

Contemporary playwrights in the United States
Contemporary playwrights in the United States often do not reach the same level of fame or cultural importance as others did in the past. No longer the only outlet for serious drama or entertaining comedies, theatrical productions must use ticket sales as a source of income, which has caused many of them to reduce the number of new works being produced. For example, Playwrights Horizons produced only six plays in the 2002–03 seasons, compared with thirty-one in 1973–74. As revivals and large-scale production musicals become the de rigueur of Broadway (and even Off-Broadway) productions, playwrights find it difficult to earn a living in the business, let alone achieve major successes.

New play development

In an effort to develop new American voices in playwriting, a phenomenon known as new play development  began to emerge in the early-to-mid-1980s, and continues through today. Many regional theatres have hired dramaturges and literary managers in an effort to showcase various festivals for new work, or bring in playwrights for residencies. Funding through national organizations, such as the National Endowment for the Arts and the Theatre Communications Group, encouraged the partnerships of professional theatre companies and emerging playwrights.

New Dramatists and The Lark theatre in New York City, for example, will often have a "cold" reading of a script in an informal sitdown setting. A cold reading means that the actors haven't rehearsed the work, or may be seeing it for the first time, and usually, the technical requirements are minimal. Shenandoah and the O'Neill Festival offer summer retreats for playwrights to develop their work with directors and actors in a totally "devoted" setting.

The 1990s saw the formation of playwriting collectives like 13P and Clubbed Thumb who have gathered members together to produce, rather than develop, new works. This has been a reaction to the "developed to death" notion in which the play never gets produced, but goes through endless readings and critiques that after a certain point in New York go through some kind of assiduous development process, and rare is the play that shows up on a producer's desk that gains any traction. On Broadway, this has happened with Mamet's Race (2009) and Martin McDonagh's A Behanding in Spokane (2010),  although these shows were packaged with stars (Christopher Walken in the latter) and with playwrights who are well established in the profession.

See also 
 List of playwrights
 Play (theatre)
 Screenwriter

References

External links 
 
 
 

 
Mass media occupations
Theatrical occupations